Bells of San Angelo  is a 1947 American Trucolor Western film directed by William Witney and starring Roy Rogers. The first Roy Rogers film shot in Trucolor, this modern day Western mixes half a dozen songs with mystery, international smuggling of silver, violence, a pack of dogs and comedy relief with one character packing a "16-shooter".

Plot
Roy is a "border inspector" ever on the alert for smuggling silver between Mexico and the United States. Roy's Mexican friends have told him that one of their own has important information about a silver mine on the American side of the border, but their contact is shot and killed by the mine guards. Before shooting him, they plant a piece of ore containing a high level of silver on his body.

The American mine owners say they play rough, as  no towns or law enforcement are anywhere near them and their mine is just across the border, making it a tempting target for robbers who plan to rob the mine then escape to Mexico.

Other events are happening in the area, such as the arrival of Western mystery author Lee Madison, whom Roy and his friends feel ridicules the West and those who live in it. The gang does not know that Lee is really a woman, so when Lee becomes aware of their dislike for her writing, she hides under an alias.

Lionel Bates arrives from England saying Scotland Yard is on the hunt for an English national named George Wallingford Lancaster. Roy notices the news greatly alarms dog-loving sheriff Cookie Bullfincher.

Cast
Roy Rogers as Roy Rogers
Trigger as Trigger, Roy's Horse
Dale Evans as Lee Madison
Andy Devine as Cookie Bullfincher
John McGuire as Rex Gridley
Olaf Hytten as Lionel Bates
Dave Sharpe as Henchman Ulrich
Fritz Leiber as Padre
Hank Patterson as Deaf Bus Passenger
Fred 'Snowflake' Toones as The Cook
Eddie Acuff as Bus Driver
Bob Nolan as Bob
Sons of the Pioneers as Musicians
Pat Brady as Pat 
Keefe Brasselle as Ignacio 
Dale Van Sickel as Henchman Mike 
Luana Walters as Lodge Clerk

Soundtrack
Roy Rogers and Sons of the Pioneers - "The Bells of San Angelo" (Written by John Elliott as Jack Elliott)
 "Lazy Days" (Written by Tim Spencer)
 "I Like to Get Up Early in the Morning" (Written by John Elliott as Jack Elliott)
 "A Cowboy's Dream of Heaven" (Written by John Elliott as Jack Elliott)
 "I Love the West" (Written by John Elliott as Jack Elliott) - Dale Evans
 Pat Brady and Sons of the Pioneers - "Hot Lead" (Written by Tim Spencer)

External links

1947 films
1947 Western (genre) films
Republic Pictures films
American Western (genre) films
Trucolor films
Films directed by William Witney
1940s English-language films
1940s American films